Sean Dylan Kelly (born May 17, 2002) is an American motorcycle racer, competing for the American Racing team in the 2022 Moto2 World Championship. He previously competed in the AMA Supersport Championship with the M4 Ecstar Suzuki team, having won the championship in 2021.

Career
In 2019, Kelly made his AMA Supersport debut aboard the Suzuki GSX-R600 of M4 Ecstar Suzuki. In his first season of the championship, he recorded two victories, both at the Pittsburgh International Race Complex and five podiums, which allowed him to finish the season in fourth place. 

Kelly continued on the M4 Ecstar Suzuki in 2020 and that season, he showed his high level. He had won five races (one at Atlanta, The Ridge, New Jersey and two at Laguna Seca), eleven podiums and three poles in 18 races. He finished the season runner-up with 341 points, forty less than champion, Richie Escalante.

The 2021 AMA Supersport Championship season was the demonstration of power for Kelly in the category. He achieved twelve victories (one in Virginia, Pittsburgh, New Jersey and Alabama and two in Atlanta, Washington, Laguna Seca and Minnesota), five second places and one sixth place was his worst finishing position of the season over 18 races. Also this season, he achieved all the poles that were contested and half of the fastest laps awarded. With his second place finish in New Jersey Race 2, Kelly became the AMA Supersport champion one round before the end of the championship.

Moto2 World Championship

American Racing KTM (2019)
Also in the year, he made his Grand Prix motorcycle racing debut in the Moto2 category; he entered the Valencian Community Grand Prix replacing Spanish racer Iker Lecuona in American Racing KTM. He qualified in 27th position and in the race he dropped out with two laps remaining.

American Racing (2022–)
On September 18, 2021, it was announced that Kelly was officially signed by American Racing in Moto2 on a two-year contract. He teamed up with five-time AMA Superbike champion Cameron Beaubier in 2022.

Career statistics

Grand Prix motorcycle racing

By season

By class

Races by year
(key) (Races in bold indicate pole position; races in italics indicate fastest lap)

 Half points awarded as less than two thirds of the race distance (but at least three full laps) was completed.

References

External links
 

2002 births
Living people
American motorcycle racers
Sportspeople from Hollywood, Florida
AMA Supersport Championship riders
Moto2 World Championship riders